At least two ships of the Argentine Navy have been named Segui:

 , a minesweeper previously the German M-90 and renamed on transfer in 1922. She was decommissioned in the 1960s
 , an  launched in 1944 as USS Hank and renamed on transfer in 1972. She was scrapped in 1983.

Argentine Navy ship names